Grupo Desportivo de Sesimbra (founded on 10 August 1947) is a Portuguese sports club from Sesimbra, Setúbal, best known for its football and Rink Hockey teams. The club was formed with the union of three clubs – União Futebol Sesimbra, Vitória Futebol Club and Ases Futebol Clube. They currently play in the Terceira Divisão after winning the Setúbal FA championship in 2009/10 season.
Prior to his management career, José Mourinho once played for this team.

External links
Official site (Portuguese)
footballzz.co.uk

Football clubs in Portugal
Association football clubs established in 1947
1947 establishments in Portugal